Geoffrey Lawrence  may refer to:

 Geoffrey Lawrence, 1st Baron Oaksey (1880–1971), British judge during the Nuremberg trials
 Frederick Geoffrey Lawrence (1902–1967), British lawyer and jurist
 Geoffrey Charles Lawrence (1915–1994), Zanzibari politician
Geoffrey Lawrence (sociologist) (born 1950), Australian academic

See also 
 Jeff Lawrence (disambiguation)